Rauno Saunavaara is a paralympic athlete from Finland competing mainly in category F54 javelin events.

Biography
Rauno has competed in the javelin at the Paralympics three occasions winning a medal on each occasion.  His first performance came in 1996 Summer Paralympics where he won a silver medal in the F53 class, he also competed in the shot put but failed to medal in this.  In 2000 he won a bronze in the F54 then improved on this in 2004 winning his second silver medal.

References

Paralympic athletes of Finland
Athletes (track and field) at the 1996 Summer Paralympics
Athletes (track and field) at the 2000 Summer Paralympics
Athletes (track and field) at the 2004 Summer Paralympics
Paralympic silver medalists for Finland
Paralympic bronze medalists for Finland
Living people
Medalists at the 1996 Summer Paralympics
Medalists at the 2000 Summer Paralympics
Medalists at the 2004 Summer Paralympics
Year of birth missing (living people)
Paralympic medalists in athletics (track and field)
Finnish male javelin throwers
20th-century Finnish people
21st-century Finnish people